The 1976 United States Senate election in Rhode Island took place on November 2, 1976. Incumbent Democratic U.S. Senator John O. Pastore did not seek re-election. Republican John Chafee won the seat, defeating Democrat Richard P. Lorber. Chafee was the first Republican to win a U.S. Senate race in Rhode Island since 1930.

Democratic primary

Candidates 
John E. Caddick
Paul E. Goulding
John P. Hawkins, Rhode Island Senate Majority Leader
Richard P. Lorber, car dealer and decorated World War II veteran
Arthur E. Marley
Philip W. Noel, Governor of Rhode Island
Earl F. Pasbach
Ralph J. Perrotta

Results

Republican primary

Candidates 
John Chafee, former U.S. Secretary of the Navy and former Governor

Declined
Buddy Cianci, Mayor of Providence

General election

Results

See also 
 1976 United States Senate elections

References

External links

Rhode Island
1976
1976 Rhode Island elections